Archboldia is a genus of bowerbirds in the family Ptilonorhynchidae.

Species
Archboldia papuensis - Archbold's bowerbird.
Archboldia sanfordi - Sanford's bowerbird.

External links
 ITES

 
Bird genera
 
Taxa named by Austin L. Rand